Morondava (from  "long coast") is a city located in Menabe Region, of which it is the capital, in Madagascar. Its population as of the 2018 census, was 53,510.

Population
The predominant tribe is the Sakalava. But there are also a few Betsileo, Tsimihety, Merina, Makoa as well as Europeans.

Transportation
Air Madagascar has regular scheduled flights to Morondava Airport. The main road to town has been renovated recently. With the new road established, a trip from Antananarivo to Morondava by taxi-brousse takes approximately 12 hours. Pirogues are consequently a popular mode of transport used to ferry people and goods along the coast, especially to Morombe.

Roads
 RN 34 to Ivato, Ambositra and Antsirabe.
 RN 8 to Belo-sur-Tsiribihina.

Ecology
These giant baobab trees are an 800-year-old legacy of the dense tropical forests that once throve here. Over the years, as the country's population grew, the forests were steadily cut down, leaving only the baobab trees, which the locals preserved for religious reasons. Today, deforestation still continues as large areas of this region, including some of few remaining baobabs, are cleared to make way for sugar cane plantations.

The Tsingy de Bemaraha Strict Nature Reserve, a UNESCO World Heritage Site, is located 150 km north of Morondava. The road from Morondava is poor, but Tsingy de Bemaraha is reachable by 4x4 in approximately 10 hours.
In the South there is the Andranomena Reserve.

Education
French international schools:
 École de l'Alliance

Religion
Roman Catholic Diocese (Cathedral of Mary Queen of the World).
 Fiangonana Jesosy Mamonjy Morondava
 FJKM - Fiangonan'i Jesoa Kristy eto Madagasikara (Church of Jesus Christ in Madagascar)

Climate

See also
Tsingy de Bemaraha Strict Nature Reserve
Madagascar dry deciduous forests
Kirindy Mitea National Park (70 km south of Morondava)

References

External links

What are the historical causes of deforestation in Madagascar and what is the situation today?

Cities in Madagascar
Populated places in Menabe
Regional capitals in Madagascar